Mohammed Chabab (Arabic: شباب محمد; pronounced [muħammad ʃabab]) is a Moroccan composer and pianist.

Biography 
Mohammed Chabab was born in Meknes. In 2008 he graduated from the National Conservatory of Music and Dance in Rabat with diplomas in piano mastery and in music harmony. His melodies are influenced by romanticism and impressionism .

Since 2008, Chabab has been solicited to participate as a composer and solo pianist in many international and national festivals such as the International Festival Mauricio Kagael Composition Competition in Austria, Valtidone Festival in Italy and several concerts in Morocco.

Chabab is a piano and music composition teacher at the National Institute for Music and Dance in Rabat from 2008.

In 2015 he won the Special Jury Prize at the International Competition of Bulgaria.

In 2016 Chabab releases his first album, a musical creation that includes 16 suites of classical music in piano solo, titled “Au Cœur d’une musique”.

Discography

Studio albums/CD 

 Au Cœur D’Une Music (2016)
 Promesse D’Amour (2016)
 Révérence d’automne (2018)

Concerts 

 On the Way of Creation (2017)

References

External links 
 Official website  
 Mohammed Chabab on SoundCloud
 Mohammed Chabab on Facebook
 Mohammed Chabab on Twitter
 Mohammed Chabab on Instagram
 Mohammed Chabab on YouTube

21st-century classical composers
Moroccan composers
Living people
Year of birth missing (living people)